Penmesterol (brand names Pandrocine, Testopan; former developmental code name RP-12222), or penmestrol, also known as 17α-methyltestosterone 3-cyclopentyl enol ether, is a synthetic, orally active anabolic-androgenic steroid (AAS) that was developed in the early 1960s. It is the 3-cyclopentyl enol ether of methyltestosterone.

See also
 Methandriol
 Methyltestosterone 3-hexyl ether
 Propetandrol

References

Androgen ethers
Androgens and anabolic steroids
Androstanes
Cyclopentyl ethers
Hepatotoxins
Prodrugs